Yeah Right! is a 2003 skateboarding video by Girl Skateboards (featuring Chocolate Skateboards), directed by Ty Evans and Spike Jonze. Yeah Right! is notable for its soundtrack, length, and the extensive use of never-before-seen (in a skateboarding video) special effects. In his book Skateboard Video, Duncan McDuie-Ra considers Yeah Right! one of the four "finalists" of the skateboard video canon.

Summary
A short prologue pays tribute to skater Keenan Milton, who died in 2001. Milton was part of Chocolate Skateboards team, a subset of Girl Skateboards.

The introduction credits for the video feature a unique series of shots in ultra-slow motion, filmed with Jonze's personal camera that is capable of shooting 100 frames per second. The camera is low to the ground and very close to the skateboarder as various flip tricks are completed.

Although Yeah Right features mainly skateboarding, there are many special effects used. There are several different scenes in between skaters' parts which make use of green screen technology like the "invisible skateboards" bit and other camera effects such as the "magic board" and the "Skatetrix" bits.

A cameo is made by Owen Wilson. He is in a parking lot with Rick Howard, Eric Koston and Mike Carroll preparing to perform a trick on a handrail. By framing the camera very carefully, it appears that Wilson attempts a backside bluntslide. However, while the camera was facing the opposite direction for a moment, Wilson had slipped out of the frame and is replaced by Eric Koston who is wearing a wig and matching clothes. Koston performs the trick down the staircase and Wilson reappears in the shot after Koston lands to make it look like he completed the trick.

Cast 
Yeah Right! features the Girl Skateboards team, along with Chocolate Skateboards.

(in order of appearance)
 Keenan Milton – memorial section before the intro of the film (Milton rode for Chocolate until his death in 2001).
 Brandon Biebel
 Brian Anderson
 Marc Johnson – Chocolate section
 Chico Brenes – Chocolate montage
 Jesus Fernandez – Chocolate montage
 Daniel Castillo – Chocolate montage
 Chris Roberts – Chocolate montage
 Ricardo Carvalho – Chocolate montage
 Scott Johnston – Chocolate montage
 Richard Mulder – Chocolate montage
 Kenny Anderson – Chocolate montage
 Mike York – Chocolate section
 Justin Eldridge – Chocolate section
 Gino Iannuci – Chocolate section
 Robbie McKinley
 Guy Mariano – Girl "Veterans" montage
 Rudy Johnson – Girl "Veterans" montage
 Tony Ferguson – Girl "Veterans" montage
 Jeron Wilson – Girl "Veterans" montage
 Rick Howard – Girl "Veterans" montage
 Paul Rodriguez
 Jereme Rogers
 Mike Carroll
 Rick McCrank
 Eric Koston

References

External links 
 
 Yeah Right! track listing

Skateboarding videos
2003 films
Films directed by Spike Jonze
2000s English-language films